Salamini–Luxor TV was an Italian professional cycling team that existed from 1966 to 1967. The team competed in the 1967 Giro d'Italia, with their rider Vittorio Adorni winning stage 20. Adorni also notably won the overall classification of the 1967 Tour de Romandie with the team.

Major wins
1967
 Stage 20 Giro d'Italia, Vittorio Adorni
 Overall Tour de Romandie, Vittorio Adorni
 Coppa Bernocchi, Vittorio Adorni 
 Giro di Romagna, Bruno Mealli
 Giro di Sardegna, Luciano Armani
 GP Monaco, Luciano Armani
 Coppa Placci, Luciano Armani

References

Defunct cycling teams based in Italy
1966 establishments in Italy
1967 disestablishments in Italy
Cycling teams established in 1966
Cycling teams disestablished in 1967